The Electoral Franchise Act, 1885, was a federal statute that regulated elections in Canada for a brief period in the late 19th century. The act was in force from 1885, when it was passed by John A. Macdonald's Conservative majority; to 1898, when Wilfrid Laurier's Liberals repealed it. The Electoral Franchise Act restricted the vote to propertied men over 21. It excluded women, Indigenous people west of Ontario, and those designated "Chinese" or "Mongolian".

Background 
Elections legislation had been on the federal agenda since Confederation in 1867. Various bills to regulate the franchise at the federal level were proposed in the House of Commons between 1867 and 1885. Macdonald sought to enact the statute in part because he believed it would be electorally advantageous for the Conservative Party.

The statute came in the wake of other legislative efforts in Canada, the United States, and the United Kingdom to define more precisely who counted as a citizen or subject. Four years earlier, in 1881, Parliament had enacted  the Naturalization and Aliens Act, 1881, which, among other provisions, explicitly provided that Indigenous people did not count as full British subjects unless they were able to vote.

Debates and drafting 

The House of Commons debated Bill 103—which would become the Electoral Franchise Act—between March and June 1885. The text initially would have allowed "spinsters" and widows who met property qualifications, as well as all Indigenous people who owned land with at least $150 in capital investment, to vote. Macdonald spoke in favour of women's suffrage at several points during the debates.

Early versions of the Electoral Franchise Act extended the franchise to all Indigenous peoples living in Canada, but following the North-West Rebellion, which occurred the same year the act was passed, it restricted voting rights only to those living in eastern Canada. 

Indigenous communities including the Six Nations of the Grand River, as well as a number of Conservatives in Parliament, opposed the bill; others, including some members of the Mississaugas of the Credit First Nation, supported it. Some Indigenous communities rejected the Electoral Franchise Act because it followed a line of other statutes, including the Gradual Civilization Act, 1857, and Gradual Enfranchisement Act, 1869, that gave Indigenous people the right to vote in Canadian elections but imposed federal control over their affairs and promoted policies of "assimilation". Such legislation also required Indigenous people to live off reserve and renounce their Indian status to be enfranchised. These statutes also mandated that Indigenous people be fluent in English or French, have "good moral character", be educated, and lack debt, if they desired to become citizens. As of 1876, only one Indigenous person had chosen to become a citizen through this process.

The Liberal Party, which strongly opposed the bill, paid people to find signatures for a petition against it. Liberals argued that the statute would increase patronage and would be expensive to administer. Liberals also argued that the Electoral Franchise Act would perpetuate Macdonald's hold over national political institutions, which he had maintained through initiatives such as the National Policy; and the gerrymander of 1882, which extensively redrew riding lines through the Representation Act, 1882. Conservatives countered that the statute would promote "national feeling" by putting control over elections in the national government.

The act passed in the House of Commons at 1:00 am on July 4, 1885. It received royal assent on July 20.

Provisions 

Jack Little argues that the Electoral Franchise Act was intended to "replace the use of provincial voting lists with uniform nation-wide franchise qualifications for federal elections".

The statute restricted the right to vote to men over 21 who were either born or naturalized British subjects. Amendments from the original text of the bill restricted the franchise considerably, preventing all women, most Indigenous people west of Ontario, and those of "Mongolian or Chinese race" from voting. On May 4, 1885, Macdonald himself introduced the amendment restricting anyone identified as a "Chinaman" from voting.

The ac also imposed a property qualification on the franchise which varied depending on the elector's residence. John Douglas Belshaw argues that, in practice, "what appear[ed] to be universal male suffrage was in fact only extended to males who satisfied residence requirements". Nonetheless, the statute did increase suffrage among men as compared to earlier legislation.

In a shift from previous federal legislation, the Electoral Franchise Act did not Indigenous people to surrender Indian status in order to vote.

Legacy 
In a letter to Charles Tupper, Macdonald called the statute his "greatest triumph". Gordon Stewart argues that the legislation was of "basic importance" to Macdonald and his party because electoral margins at the time were routinely razor-thin and thus control over lists of those qualified to vote was vital in winning elections.

Wilfrid Laurier's Liberal majority repealed the Electoral Franchise Act in 1898. The Franchise Act, 1898, received royal assent on June 13, 1898.

See also 

 Chinese Immigration Act, 1885

References

Sources 
 
 
 
 
 
  
 
 
 
 
 

1885 in Canadian law
Canadian federal legislation
Elections in Canada
Repealed Canadian legislation